The Belbali people are the northernmost Songhay subgroup. They are found primarily in the villages of Kwara, Ifrenyu and Yami in the oasis of Tabelbala in Algeria's Béchar Province. Significant numbers are also in the town of Tindouf

References

Songhai people